Darreh Chi may refer to:
 Darreh Chi, Kohgiluyeh and Boyer-Ahmad
 Darreh Chi, Lorestan